Beijing Forestry University (BFU/BJFU) is a public university located at Haidian District of Beijing, China.

An environmentally friendly university sharing knowledge of the sciences, engineering, law, arts and languages to the world. It is one of the Double First Class University Plan and Project 211 universities (top 100 China's universities in the 21st century) and it provides a wide range of courses such as Artificial Intelligence, Automation, Biology, Computer science, Economics, Electronics, Environmental Science, Forestry, Languages, Laws, Management, Mathematics, Physics and Psychology. To share its environmental friendly mind to the world, the university is now providing modern technologies for people to protect the earth. It is a Chinese state Double First Class University, identified by the Ministry of Education of China.

History 
Beijing Forestry University was founded as the Forestry Department of the Imperial University of Peking in 1902. In 1952 it had become an institute and was renamed to Beijing Institute of Forestry. In 1985 it was renamed to Beijing Forestry University and focused on a wide range of new subjects including Electronics, Computer Science, Psychology and Economics. BFU has 14 schools providing more than 60 undergraduate programs, 120 postgraduate programs and 40 Ph.D. programs.

Schools 
The university has 14 schools:
 School of Art
 School of Biological Sciences and Biotechnology
 School of Economics and Management
 School of Environmental Science and Engineering
 School of Foreign Languages
 School of Forestry
 School of Humanities and Social Sciences
 School of Information Science and Technology
 School of Landscape Architecture
 School of Material Science and Technology
 School of Nature Conservation
 School of Science
 School of Soil and Water Conservation
 School of Technology

Faculty 
Since its establishment over 50 years ago, more than 30,000 Chinese and foreign students have graduated from Beijing Forestry University. Of that number 11 have attained the position of academician. The faculty consists of 956 full-time teachers including five academicians and 496 professors. While upholding traditional disciplines the university also established a large number of disciplines designed to meet the needs of society. The university consists of 15 schools; the graduate school, biological science and technology, landscape architecture, forestry, environmental science and engineering, soil and water conservation, industry, information science, material science and technology, science, conservation, economic management, humanities and social sciences, foreign languages, vocational training and continuing education.

The university features a computer center, computer network center, educational center, audio-visual teaching center, biological center, micro-technology center, forest-organism center and a tree farm for teaching and research (the Jiu Feng National Forest Park). Attached to the university are the Foreign-Language Training Center of the State Forestry Administration, the Research Center of Soil Control Technology of Loess Plateau in China and the Training Center of Desertification Control of China. BFU is a well-equipped institution, featuring the Central Building of Teaching, a gymnasium, laboratories, and a high-speed campus network. A computerized checking system exists for library books and the library building is the Imported Teaching Materials Center for forestry universities and colleges nationwide. Construction of a high-rise student apartment building and a new classroom building was completed in 2001.

In recent years, nearly 200 discoveries in scientific research received awards from national, provincial and ministerial authorities and more than 20 achievements of teaching were rewarded by the national and municipal governments. BFU is engaged in international academic exchanges and cooperation with more than 150 universities and research institutions in over 20 countries providing opportunities for contacts between China and the outside world in the fields of forestry and environmental studies.

BFU provides an atmosphere for teaching and learning combining the acquisition of professional knowledge with an improvement of all-round abilities (with an emphasis on forging a rigorous, creative academic style). Systems of optional courses, subsidiary courses, course exemption, and bachelor-to-master continuing education have been established so students may develop according to their own interests and desires. The university also offers extracurricular activities to enrich campus life; these are organized by student societies and associations in fields including science and technology, art, sports, environmental protection, and politics. Some groups have become influential, including the Society of Scientific Exploration and Wilderness Survival and the Association of Beijing College Volunteers for Environmental Protection. The former received the Prize of the Earth, the top prize from the National Bureau of Environmental Protection. In recent years, BFU students of BFU won four consecutive prizes at the College Students' Landscape Gardening Architecture Design Competitions (sponsored by UNESCO and the International Association of Landscape Gardening Architects), the Golden Prize in International College Students' Architecture Design and prizes in garden-design competitions. Achievements were also earned in domestic competitions for scientific inventions, mathematics, and art.

Notable people
Notable alumni include:
He Qiaonv, founder of Beijing Orient Landscape, one of Asia's largest landscape architecture companies
Cui Yuying, Deputy Head of the Propaganda Department of the Chinese Communist Party

Notes

References

External links
 Official website
 International College 
  Campus real three-dimensional map

 
Universities and colleges in Haidian District
Forestry education
Forestry in China
Plan 111